Araceli Edith González (born June 19, 1967) is an Argentine actress, fashion model and TV host.

Biography
González was born in Buenos Aires, Argentina.

She began performing arts at a young age after winning a dance tournament at the theater "el Globo Rojo" in the Buenos Aires area. At only nine years of age, she was invited by the Cohen Agency to participate in commercial productions. By the time she became a teenager, her career was starting to take course into the fashion industry, becoming the face of many fashion products and walking at many fashion shows in Argentina and Europe. Initially, her face became known in Buenos Aires during a massive hair campaign by Llongueras, displaying the image of her straight dark hair in contrast to the curly reddish hair of the male model Vito. Thereafter, Araceli's modelling stardom was captivated by her full-body editorials for the campaign "Caro Coure". González's figure was linked to various trade marks around the world during the late 1980s and 1990s.

After working as actress in Europe, she later returned to Argentina. In 2006-2007 she played Gabriela Solís in Amas de Casa Desesperadas. She also took part in numerous films and theater productions.

Private life

González, who married at age 20 to actor Rubén Torrente in 1988, had already given birth to her first child, a daughter, Florencia Torrente, early that year; her marriage lasted until 1991. She also has a son Tomás Kirzner, from her marriage to Adrián Suar whom she married in 1996. They divorced in 2002. She has been married to present husband Fabián Mazzei, since 2008.

External links
 
 
 Araceli González in Argentine commercial of Citroën C4

1967 births
Living people
Actresses from Buenos Aires
Argentine people of Spanish descent
Argentine film actresses
Argentine female models
Argentine telenovela actresses
Argentine television actresses
21st-century Argentine women